Bermudiana is derived from the Bermuda, the name of an Atlantic archipelago that is a British Overseas Territory. It may refer to:

 Bermudiana Mill., a former genus of plants in the iris family now accepted as species of Sisyrinchium, Calydorea, Eleutherine, Iris, Libertia, and Olsynium
Bermudiana bermudiana, known as Bermudiana, now accepted as Sisyrinchium bermudiana
 Carex bermudiana, a species of sedge indigenous to Bermuda
 Juniperus bermudiana, commonly known as Bermuda cedar, a species of juniper indigenous to Bermuda
 Pecluma bermudiana, a species of fern indigenous to Bermuda.
 Agrostis bermudiana, now accepted as Cynodon dactylon, Bermuda grass
 Chiococca bermudiana, now accepted as Chiococca alba, a flower in the family Rubiaceae